Jefferys is a surname. Notable people with the name include:
 
 Charles Jefferys (1807–1865), English music publisher and composer
 Charles William Jefferys (1869–1951), Canadian historical illustrator
 Eddie Jefferys (fl. 2010s), English music producer
 Edward Jefferys (1936–1998), South African sprinter
 John Jefferys (fl. mid-18th century), British game designer
 John Jefferys (clockmaker) (1701–1754), English horologist
 Margot Jefferys (1916–1999), British medical sociologist
 Steve Jefferys, Australian horse trainer, appeared in the 2000 Sydney Olympics Opening Ceremony
 Thomas Jefferys (c. 1719–1771), English cartographer
 William H. Jefferys (born 1940), American astronomer

See also
 Jefferys Allen (1760–1844), British politician, MP for Bridgwater
 Jefferies